Khamlia is very small village located on the edge of sand dunes of Erg Chebbi in southeast Morocco near the Algerian border.   The village is also called the southern gateway to the Sahara, which begins in Algeria. There is a larger village named Merzouga in about 7 km away from Khamilia. From here you can get to Taouz, Zagora and a mineral mines.  

There are some shops, a primary school, a small guesthouse, a cafe and a restaurant Nora in Khamilia. There is also electricity and water. The number of houses is about 60-80 with around 250-300 people living there.

Khamlia is an excellent base for desert exploration and bird watchers. 

The village is also known for the music band Gnawa known throughout Morocco. They are descendants of Sub-saharan slaves and their musical style is completely different from the Arabic style. It is a spiritual music that touches the soul, thus causing a desire to dance and participate as well. There is a festival in Essaouira in summer, and finally in Khamilia itself every August.

References

Populated places in Errachidia Province
Oases of Morocco